Marc Edward Neikrug (born September 24, 1946) is a contemporary American composer, pianist, and conductor. He was born in New York City, the son of cellists George Neikrug and Olga Zundel. He is best known for a Piano Concerto (1966), the theater piece Through Roses (1980), and the opera Los Alamos (1988). Among his notable recent compositions are the orchestral song cycle Healing Ceremony (2010), his Concerto for Orchestra (2012), a Bassoon Concerto (2013), and the Canta-Concerto (2014). He studied with Giselher Klebe at the Hochschule für Musik Detmold from 1964 to 1968, and composition at Stony Brook University (M.M., 1971). In 1978 he was appointed as consultant on contemporary music to the Saint Paul Chamber Orchestra. Since the late 1990s he has been artistic director of the Santa Fe Chamber Music Festival. He is also known for collaborations with violinist Pinchas Zukerman.

Selected recordings
Camille Saint-Saëns, Sonata N 1 in D minor for violin and piano, Cèsar Franck, Sonata in A for violin and piano, Pinchas Zukerman, violin, Marc Neikrug, piano. CD Philips 1984.

References

American male classical composers
American classical composers
American classical pianists
American male pianists
American opera composers
Male opera composers
American male conductors (music)
20th-century classical composers
21st-century classical composers
1946 births
Living people
Place of birth missing (living people)
20th-century American composers
20th-century American pianists
20th-century American conductors (music)
21st-century American conductors (music)
21st-century classical pianists
20th-century American male musicians
21st-century American male musicians
21st-century American pianists